Pier 2 in Seattle, Washington (after May 1, 1944, Pier 51) was an important shipping terminal.

Location
Pier 2 was located at the foot of Yesler Way.  Pier 2 was immediately to the north of Pier 1 and immediately to the south of Colman Dock.

History
Pier 21 and Pier 1 to its south were built between 1901 and 1904, replacing Yesler's Wharf.
In 1904, Joshua Green's La Conner Trading, by then a subsidiary of the Puget Sound Navigation Company, was operating jointly with businessman H.B. Kennedy as the Navy Yard Route on the Seattle – Bremerton run.  Disposing of three vessels, including the Inland Flyer, Athlon, and the sternwheeler Port Orchard, the Navy Yard route ran six sailings a day from Pier 2 to and from Bremerton, Washington.

In 1917, like Pier 1, Pier 2 was owned by the Northern Pacific Railway, although in the case of Pier 2 it was operated by the Alaska Steamship Company. Track capacity at Pier 2 was 18 rail cars. Like Pier 1, Pier 2 had adjustable slips. In 1917 Pier 2 had an electric crane, with a capacity 25 tons.

As with Pier 1/50, Alaska Steamship Company left in the late 1940s. The pier had various uses over the next three decades. Washington State Ferries moored ships there; eventually the pier lost its shed and became mainly a parking lot. In the early 1960s, the restaurant Polynesia was built there. The pier was also home to Ye Olde Curiosity Shop., In 1971, it was owned and/or operated by Seattle Piers, Inc. and, along with Pier 1/50, was the proposed site for a World Trade Center, which was ultimately built elsewhere. The pier was torn down early 1980s to expand the Washington State Ferries terminal at Pier 52 (Colman Dock).

Notes

References
 Beaton, Welford, ed. Frank Waterhouse & Company's Pacific Ports: A Commercial Geography (1917) (accessed 06-09-11).
 Newell, Gordon R., ed., H.W. McCurdy Marine History of the Pacific Northwest,  Superior Publishing Co., Seattle, WA (1966)
 State of Washington, Public Utilities Comm'n, Third Annual Report (covering the period from Dec. 1, 1912 to Nov. 30, 1913), Vol. 3, at page 199. (accessed 06-09-11)

Transport infrastructure completed in 1904
History of King County, Washington
Piers in Seattle
Central Waterfront, Seattle
Northern Pacific Railway